"Your Body" is the second hit single by the R&B group Pretty Ricky produced by Jim Jonsin. It reached #12 on the Billboard Hot 100. It was the second single from their debut album, Bluestars.

The "Your Body" video starts with Pretty Ricky on the beach saying "Yes sir, yes sir, yes sir, yes sir," then they start singing, rapping and dancing the "Your Body" dance. Then the scene changes to them driving on the highway, and then Spectacular and Slick rap while they are walking along the beach. Spectacular Shirtless Rapping. Baby Blue raps while sitting with two girls in the car and partially standing next to his brothers in front the car in front the beach. At the end of the video Slick is shown still dancing and laughing while his brothers get in the car and the scene changes to show Spec following the camera and smiling and being silly while Pleasure shakes his head walking off.

Charts

Release history

References

External links

2005 singles
Pretty Ricky songs
Song recordings produced by Jim Jonsin
Songs written by Static Major
2005 songs
Atlantic Records singles
Dirty rap songs